Himekawa (written: 姫川) is a Japanese surname which means "Princess of Rivers". It may refer to:

 Akira Himekawa, a pen name of a duo of female Japanese comic book artists
 Himekawa Dam, three dams in Hakuba, Nagano Prefecture, Japan
 Himekawa Station (Hokkaido), a railway station in Mori, Japan
 Himekawa Station (Niigata), a railway station in Itoigawa, Japan

Fictional characters
 Aoi Himekawa, a supporting character in the anime series Haikyu!!
 Elena Himekawa, a supporting character in the anime series Phi Brain: Kami no Puzzle
 Fuuka Himekawa, a main character in the game Kamikaze ☆ Explorer!
 Hayuru Himekawa, a main character in the anime/light novel series Masou Gakuen HxH 
 Kaori Himekawa, a supporting character in the anime/manga Kenkō Zenrakei Suieibu Umishō
 Kazumi Himekawa, a supporting character in the game series Pia Carrot e Youkoso!!
 Kotone Himekawa, a supporting character in the anime/game series To Heart
 Maika Himekawa, a supporting character in the anime/manga series Shugo Chara!
 Tatsuya Himekawa, a supporting character in the anime/manga series Beelzebub
 Tokino Himekawa, a supporting character in the anime/light novel series Saenai Heroine no Sodatekata
 Youko Himekawa, a supporting character in the anime/manga series Natsu no Arashi!
 Yuki Himekawa, a supporting character in the anime/game series THE iDOLM@STER CINDERELLA GIRLS

Japanese-language surnames